Pieve di Soligo is a town in the province of Treviso, near the border with the province of Belluno in Veneto, Italy. , its had 12,096 inhabitants.

"Pieve" means "Parish church".

Notable people
 Antonio Bellucci (Pieve di Soligo, 1654 – Pieve di Soligo, 1726), painter.
 Fausto Braga (Lozzo Atestino, 1864 – Pieve di Soligo, 1932), puppeteer.
 Toti Dal Monte (Mogliano Veneto, 27 June 1893 – Pieve di Soligo, 26 January 1975), soprano.
 Sabrina Donadel (Pieve di Soligo, 15 June 1970), journalist.
 Francesco Fabbri (Pieve di Soligo, 15 August 1921 – 20 January 1977), politician.
 Silvio Padoin (Pieve di Soligo, 11 April 1930), bishop.
 Emilia Salvioni (Bologna, 2 April 1895 – Bologna, 4 June 1968), writer.
 Giuseppe Toniolo (Treviso, 6 March 1845 – Pisa, 7 October 1918), economist.
 Andrea Zanzotto (Pieve di Soligo, 10 October 1921 – 18 October 2011), poet.

References

Notes